Buster Keaton Rides Again is a 55-minute 1965 documentary film   directed by John Spotton and narrated by Michael Kane. The film is a behind-the-scenes documentary shot while Buster Keaton's film The Railrodder (1965), was being produced. Although it is a production documentary, the film is actually longer than The Railrodder, which was only 24 minutes long. Both films were produced by the National Film Board of Canada (NFB). A French version of Buster Keaton Rides Again, Avec Buster Keaton was also released.

Synopsis
Buster Keaton Rides Again combines behind-the-scenes footage during the filming of The Railrodder with a retrospective of Keaton's work including scenes from The Butcher Boy (1917), The Frozen North (1922), Seven Chances (1925), and The General (1927).  
Keaton and Gerald Potterton, his director on The Railrodder, discussed and occasionally argued over gags in the film with the director concerned about the safety of his star.

During the filming of The Railrodder, Keaton celebrated his 69th birthday. He also had the opportunity to meet fans across Canada.

Production
Filmed concurrently with the production of The Railrodder during the fall of 1964, the NFB documentary was filmed in black-and-white, as opposed to the short film itself, which is in colour. The choice of black-and-white was not only for economic reasons, as the format allowed for an easy integration of the footage from Keaton's earlier films.

Reception
Buster Keaton Rides Again was released with The Railrodder. The motivation behind making The Railrodder with Buster Keaton, was that "critics were rediscovering and wildly praising his great silent comedies of the '20s." Produced primarily as a made-for-television short feature on the Canadian Broadcasting Corporation (CBC), after broadcast, the film was made available on 16 mm to schools, libraries and other interested parties. The film was also made available to film libraries operated by university and provincial authorities.

Awards
 18th Canadian Film Awards, Montreal: Best Film, General Information, 1966
 Montreal International Film Festival, Montreal: First Prize, Medium-Length Films, 1966
 Golden Gate International Film Festival, San Francisco: Silver Trophy, Documentary, 1966
 International Exhibition of the Documentary Film, Venice: CIDALC Special Prize, 1966
 American Film and Video Festival, New York: First Prize, Music, Literature & Films, 1967
 Melbourne Film Festival, Melbourne: Special Prize for Best Biographical Documentary, 1967
 MIFED International Contest of Public Relations, Milan: Gold Medal 1968
 20th British Academy Film Awards, London: Nominee: BAFTA Award for Best Documentary, 1967

Availability
Buster Keaton Rides Again and The Railrodder are available for free streaming on the National Film Board's website as well as on DVD. It is also on the NFB's YouTube channel. In Canada, the NFB itself markets the DVD, while Kino Video distributes the film in the United States.

References

Notes

Citations

Bibliography

External links
 Watch Buster Keaton Rides Again at NFB.ca (requires Adobe Flash) or YouTube
 
 Buster Keaton Rides Again at NFB Collections page

1965 films
1960s English-language films
Canadian documentary films
National Film Board of Canada documentaries
Documentary films about actors
Black-and-white documentary films
Documentary films about films
Documentary films about film directors and producers
Documentary films about rail transport
1965 documentary films
Cultural depictions of Buster Keaton
Documentary films about the cinema of Canada
Canadian black-and-white films
Quebec films
English-language Canadian films
1960s Canadian films